Tibesti Ouest is a department of Tibesti Region in Chad.  It was created by Ordinance No. 002 / PR / 08 of 19 February 2008. Its seat is Zouar

Subdivisions 
The department of Tibesti West is divided into 3 sub-prefectures:

 Zouar
 Wour
 Goubonne

Administration 
List of administrators :

 Prefect of Tibesti Ouest (since 2008)

 October 9, 2008: Galmaye Abdallah 
 November 24, 2014 Mahamat Seid Haggar

References 

Departments of Chad